Hans Sinniger (born 9 July 1929) is a Swiss former sports shooter. He competed in the 50 metre rifle, prone event at the 1968 Summer Olympics.

References

External links
 

1929 births
Living people
People from Aarau District
Swiss male sport shooters
Olympic shooters of Switzerland
Shooters at the 1968 Summer Olympics
Sportspeople from Aargau